The Black Fire was a massive wildfire that burned in the northern Black Range in Sierra County, Catron County, and Grant County, Northeast of Silver City, in the state of New Mexico in the United States as part of the 2022 New Mexico wildfire season.

On June 9th the fire surpassed the Whitewater–Baldy complex Fire to become the second largest fire in modern New Mexico history, behind the Calf Canyon/Hermits Peak Fire. Previously, on May 27th, it had become the third largest fire in state history.

, the Black Fire has burned  and is 70% contained. The fire has destroyed 2 structures and threatens an additional 51 structures nearby. The footprint of the fire spans approximately 33 miles north to south, and 30 miles east to west.

Events 
The Black fire started on May 13th, due to human cause.

The origin of the fire was centered on "Me-Own Air Strip" off of Forest Road 150 near Middle Mesa, in a rural area of Gila National Forest. 

In the span of one week the fire grew to 100,000 acres. As of May 21st there are 615 personnel working on the fire. The fire is being managed by a type 2 team, the Southwest Area Incident Management Team 5, led by Mike Spilde.

The region has been experiencing sustained critical fire weather conditions, including red flag warnings, which are contributing to explosive fire growth.

Between May 15th and May 17th, the fire grew over 27,000 acres per a day, fueled by red flag conditions. On May 18th, the Black Fire became the fourth largest wildfire in recorded New Mexico state history.

, the blaze is over 120,000 acres and 4% contained.

, the blaze is over 246,648 acres and 28% contained.

, the blaze is over 298,440 acres and 44% contained.

, the blaze is over 325,133 acres and 70% contained.

Impacts 
Much of the burn area encompasses the Aldo Leopold Wilderness.

The fire has burned over 41 miles of the Continental Divide Trail, as well as 7.5 miles of the scenic spur trail to Reeds Peak. The CDT has been rerouted to avoid the fire. The CDT has also been rerouted in the past due to previous fires in the area.

Injuries, deaths, and destruction 
No fatalities have been reported as a result of the Black Fire.

Closures and evacuations 
Gila National Forest was under level 2 fire restrictions and New Mexico Highways 59 and 152 were closed.

Environmental 
Smoke from the Black Fire, in addition to the Calf Canyon/Hermits Peak Fire burning in northern New Mexico, has contributed to poor air quality throughout the region.

Cultural 
Gila Cliff Dwellings National Monument and the historic mining town of Winston, New Mexico are in the vicinity of the fire. Protective measures have been deployed by the Forest Service in order to prevent damage to historical cabins.

Progression and containment status
Acreage and containment figures for the Black Fire:

See also 
 Calf Canyon/Hermits Peak Fire
 2022 New Mexico wildfires

References

External links 
 Black Fire information at InciWeb
 Black Fire information at New Mexico Fire Information

Wildfires in New Mexico
2022 New Mexico wildfires
Gila National Forest
May 2022 events in the United States